María Antonieta Duque (born 2 March 1970) is a Venezuelan TV presenter, comedian and actress.

She studied acting at the famous Luz Columba academy under the instruction of professor Nelson Ortega.

Her television career began in 1989 in the sketch comedy show Bienvenidos. She landed her first acting role in the telenovela Amantes de Luna Llena in 2000.

Telenovelas

 Amantes de Luna Llena (2000) as Angelica
 Guerra de mujeres (2001) as Blanca
 Las González (2002) as Gardenia
 Ángel Rebelde (2004) as Rubi
 El amor las vuelve locas (2005) as Amapola
 Voltea pa' que te enamores (2007) as Matilde Sanchez
 ¿Vieja Yo? (2009) as Tamara Lujan de Fuentes/Maricarmen
 La viuda joven (2011) as Iris Fuenmayor/Vilma Bravo
 El árbol de Gabriel (2012) as Patricia
 Válgame Dios (2012) as Gloria Zamora
 Corazón Esmeralda (2014) as Blanca Aurora López
 Entre tu amor y mi amor (2016) as Ricarda Blanco "Rika White"

Programs
 Bienvenidos

References

External links
 
 MARÍA ANTONIETA DUQUE at 

Living people
1970 births
Venezuelan television presenters
Venezuelan television talk show hosts
Venezuelan telenovela actresses
Venezuelan television personalities
Actresses from Caracas
Venezuelan women comedians
Venezuelan women television presenters